Maryam Khatoonpour Molkara (1950 – 25 March 2012) was a campaigner for the rights of transgender people in Iran, where she is widely recognized as a matriarch of the transgender community. Designated male at birth, she was later instrumental in obtaining a letter which acted as a fatwa enabling sex reassignment surgery to exist as part of a legal framework.

Early life 
In 1950, Molkara was born, and was the only child of her father's second of eight wives. Her father was a landowner. Molkara says she always preferred clothes, toys, and activities that were traditionally for girls.

Transition and advocacy 
In her adolescence, Molkara went to parties dressed as a woman. Molkara came out as transgender to her mother, but she refused to accept her. This made Molkara decide to take feminizing hormones instead of immediately seeking out surgery. She also dressed and lived as a woman.

In 1975, Molkara traveled to London and learned more about her identity. She states it was there she embraced that she was not gay, but transgender.

Molkara started to write letters to Ayatollah Ruhollah Khomeini, then in exile in Iraq, asking for religious advice about being assigned a wrong gender at birth and having to break out of it. In one of these letters, she said that her gender was clear since she was two years old, as she used to apply chalk to her face to imitate putting on makeup. He had already written in 1963 that corrective surgeries for intersex people is not against Islamic law, and his answer was based on this existing idea rather than developing a new fatwa for transgender people. He suggested she live as a woman, which included dressing as one.

After this, she met with Farah Pahlavi, who gave her support towards Molkara and other transgender individuals wanting sex reassignment surgery.

In 1978, she traveled to Paris, where Khomeini was then based, to try to make him aware about transgender rights.

After the Islamic Revolution, Molkara started to face intense backlash due to her identity. She had to go through many questions, arrests, and death threats. She was fired from her job at the Iranian National Radio and Television, forced to wear masculine clothing, injected with male hormones against her will, and detained in a psychiatric institution. Because of good contacts with religious leaders, among them Akbar Hashemi Rafsanjani, she was released.

At the start of the Iran–Iraq War, Molkara volunteered as a nurse on the front lines. She has stated that some of the men she treated assumed she was a woman due to her gentleness.

Molkara continued to campaign for her right to get sex reassignment surgery. In 1985, she confronted Khomeini in his home in North Tehran. She wore a man's suit, carried the Quran, and she tied shoes around her neck. This was a reference to the Ashura festival, and also indicated that she was looking for refuge. Molkara was held back and beaten by security guards until Khomeini's brother, Hassan Pasandide, intervened. He took Molkara into his house, where she emotionally pleaded her case, yelling "I'm a woman, I'm a woman!" His security guards were suspicious about her chest, as they thought she could be carrying explosives. She revealed they were her breasts, as she developed them using hormone therapy. Having heard her story, Ahmad Khomeini was touched and took Molkara to speak to his father, where he asked three of his doctors about the surgery in an attempt to make a well-informed decision. Khomeini then decided that sex reassignment surgery was needed to allow her to carry out her religious duties. This resulted in Khomeini issuing a fatwa, meaning he determined sex reassignment surgery to not be against Islamic law. Molkara lobbied for the according medical knowledge and procedures to be implemented in Iran and worked on helping other transgender people have access to surgeries. She completed her sex assignment surgery in Thailand in 1997, because she was dissatisfied with the quality of the surgery in Iranian hospitals. The Iranian government paid for her surgery, and she was able to help establish government funding for many other transgender individual's surgeries.

In 2007, she founded and subsequently ran the Iranian Society to Support Individuals with Gender Identity Disorder (ISIGID, انجمن), the first state-approved organization for transgender rights in Iran. Before this, she was using her own property in Karaj to help other transgender people receive legal advice and medical care, including post-op care. She continued advocating for other transgender people for years, bailing them out after they're arrested, even knowing she will likely face violence for doing so.

Death 
Molkara died in 2012, after suffering from a heart attack at the age of 62.

See also

LGBT rights in Iran

References

1950 births
Iranian LGBT rights activists
Transgender women
Transgender topics and religion
Iranian LGBT people
2012 deaths
Transgender Muslims